Parable of the Sower is a 1993 speculative fiction novel by American writer Octavia E. Butler. It is a post-apocalyptic fiction novel that provides commentary on climate change and social inequality. The novel follows Lauren Olamina, a young woman who can feel the pain of others and becomes displaced from her home. Several characters from various walks of life join her on her journey north and learn of a religion she has discovered and titled Earthseed. In this religion, the destiny for believers is to inhabit other planets, alongside working with the change that the earth is undergoing to survive with the reoccurring message of “God is Change”, referring to the Earth as a god.

Parable of the Sower was the winner of multiple awards, including the 1994 New York Times Notable Book of the Year, and has been adapted into a concert and a graphic novel. Parable of the Sower has influenced music and essays on social justice as well as climate change. In 2021, it was picked by readers of the New York Times as the top science fiction nomination for the best book of the last 125 years.

Parable of the Sower is the first in an unfinished series of novels, followed by Parable of the Talents in 1998.

Plot
Beginning in 2024, when society in the United States has grown unstable due to climate change, growing wealth inequality, and corporate greed, Parable of the Sower takes the form of a journal kept by Lauren Oya Olamina, an African American teenager. Her mother abused drugs during her pregnancy and left Lauren with "hyper-empathy" or "sharing": the uncontrollable ability to feel the sensations she witnesses in others, particularly the abundant pain in her world.   

Lauren grows up in the remnants of a gated community in Robledo, California, twenty miles from Los Angeles, where she and her neighbors struggle but are separate from the abject poverty of the world outside. Outside of the community are numerous homeless and mutilated individuals who resent the community members for their relative affluence. Public services such as police or firefighters are untrustworthy, exploiting their positions for profit and making little effort to help. Lauren's father, a Baptist pastor, holds the community together through Baptist religion, mutual aid, and careful use of resources, such as making bread from acorns. However, Lauren is increasingly certain that despite all efforts, society will continue to deteriorate and the community will no longer be safe; Lauren secretly prepares to travel north, as many do in search of rare paid jobs. The newly elected radical, authoritarian President Donner loosens labor protections, creating a rise in company towns owned by foreign businesses. Lauren privately develops her own new belief system based on the belief that "God is Change" is the only lasting truth, and that humanity, should "shape God" in order to aid themselves. She comes to call this religion Earthseed.  

Lauren's younger half brother, Keith, rebelliously runs away to live outside the walls of the community. For a time, he survives by joining a group of ruthless thieves who value him for his rare literacy, but he is eventually found dead after torture. Later, Lauren's father disappears while leaving the community for work and is accepted as dead.  

When Lauren is eighteen in 2027, the community's security is breached in an organized attack by outsiders: most of the community is destroyed, looted, and murdered, including Lauren's family. She travels north, disguised as a man, with Harry Balter and Zahra Moss, two survivors from her community. Society outside the community walls has reverted to chaos due to resource scarcity and poverty. U.S. states have become akin to city-states with strict borders. Money still has value, but travelers constantly fear attacks for resources or by pyromaniac drug-users, cannibals, and wild dogs. Interracial relationships are stigmatized, women fear sexual assault, and slavery has returned in the form of indebted servitude.

Lauren gathers people to protect along her journey and begins to share the Earthseed religion, which is developing into a collection of texts titled Earthseed: The Books of the Living. She believes that humankind's destiny is to travel beyond the deteriorating Earth and live on other planets, forcing humankind into its adulthood, and that Earthseed is preparation for this destiny. Lauren begins a relationship with Bankole, an older doctor who joins the group, and agrees to marry him. Bankole takes the group to the land he owns in northern California, where the group settles and Lauren founds the first Earthseed community, Acorn.

Sequel novels
The sequel to Parable of the Sower, Parable of the Talents, was published in 1998.

Butler began to write a third Parable novel, tentatively titled Parable of the Trickster, which would have focused on an Earthseed community's struggle to survive on a new planet. Along with the third novel, Butler was planning several others titled Parable of the Teacher, Parable of Chaos, and Parable of Clay. She began Parable of the Trickster after finishing Parable of the Talents, and mentioned her work on it in a number of interviews, but at some point encountered writer's block. She eventually shifted her creative attention, resulting in Fledgling, her final novel. The various false starts for the novel can now be found among Butler's papers at the Huntington Library, as described in an article at the Los Angeles Review of Books. Butler died in 2006, leaving the series unfinished.

Publication and award history
Published by Four Walls Eight Windows in 1993, by Women's Press Ltd. in 1995, by Warner in 1995 and 2000, and by Seven Stories Press in 2017.
 2020 – became a New York Times bestseller on September 3, 2020, appearing on the Trade Paperback Fiction list.
 1995 – nominated for Nebula Award for Best Novel
 1994 – New York Times Notable Book of the Year

Adaptations

Parable of the Sower was adapted as Parable of the Sower: The Concert Version, a work-in-progress opera written by American folk/blues musician Toshi Reagon in collaboration with her mother, singer and composer Bernice Johnson Reagon. The adaptation's libretto and musical score combine African-American spirituals, soul, rock and roll, and folk music into rounds to be performed by singers sitting in a circle. It was performed as part of The Public Theater's Under the Radar Festival in New York City in 2015 and in 2018.

In 2020, it was adapted by Damian Duffy and John Jennings, the team which had previously adapted Butler's novel Kindred, and published by Abrams ComicArts. The graphic novel was named to the Black Lives Matter Reading Lists compiled by the Graphic Novels & Comics Round Table and the Black Caucus of the American Library Association. It went on to win the 2021 Ignyte Award for Best Comics Team and the 2021 Hugo Award for Best Graphic Story.

In popular culture
The work of hip hop/R&B duo THEESatisfaction was influenced by Octavia Butler. The third track from their 2012 album awE NaturalE, "Earthseed", contains themes from the Parable series: "Change there are few words / That you can say / We all watch things morphing everyday."

In 2015, Adrienne Maree Brown and Walidah Imarisha co-edited Octavia's Brood: Science Fiction Stories from Social Justice Movements, a collection of 20 short stories and essays about social justice inspired by Butler. In June 2020, Brown and Toshi Reagon began hosting the podcast Octavia's Parables, which gives an in-depth dive into Parable of the Sower and Parable of the Talents.

See also 

 Climate fiction

Further reading 
 Agusti, Clara Escoda. "The Relationship between Community and Subjectivity in Octavia E. Butler's Parable of the Sower.' Extrapolation 46.3 (Fall 2005): 351–359.
 Allen, Marlene D. "Octavia Butler's 'Parable' Novels and the 'Boomerang' of African American History." Callaloo 32. 4 2009 pp. 1353–1365. .
 Andréolle, Donna Spalding. "Utopias of Old, Solutions for the New Millennium: A Comparative Study of Christian Fundamentalism in M. K. Wren's A Gift upon the Shore and Octavia Butler's Parable of the Sower." Utopian Studies 12.2 (2001): 114–123. .
 Butler, Robert. "Twenty-First Century Journeys in Octavia E. Butler's Parable of the Sower." Contemporary African American Fiction: The Open Journey. Madison: Fairleigh Dickinson UP, 1998. 133–143. 
 Caputi, Jane. "Facing Change: African Mythic Origins in Octavia Butler's Parable Novels." Goddesses and Monsters: Women, Myth, Power, and Popular Culture. Madison: U of Wisconsin P, 2004. 366–369. 
 Dubey, M. "Folk and Urban Communities in African-American Women's Fiction: Octavia Butler's Parable of the Sower." Studies in American Fiction 27. 1 1999 pp. 103–128. 
 Govan, Sandra. "The Parable of the Sower as Rendered by Octavia Butler: Lessons for Our Changing Times." FEMSPEC 4.2 (2004): 239–258.
 Grant-Britton, Lisbeth. "Octavia Butler's Parable of the Sower.” Women of Other Worlds: Excursions through Science Fiction and Feminism. Ed. Helen Merrick and Tess Williams. Nedlands, Australia: U of Western Australia P, 1999. 280–294. 
 Hampton, Gregory J. "Migration and Capital of the Body: Octavia Butler's Parable of the Sower.” CLA Journal 49 (Sept. 2005): 56–73.
 Harris, Trudier. "Balance? Octavia E. Butler s Parable of the Sower.” Saints, Sinners, Saviors: Strong Black Women in African American Literature. New York: Palgrave, 2001. 153–171. 
 Jablon, Madelyn. "Metafiction as Genre: Walter Mosley, Black Betty; Octavia E. Butler, Parable of the Sower.” Black Metafiction: Self Consciousness in African American Literature. Iowa City: U of Iowa P, 1997. 139–165.  
 Jos, Philip H. "Fear and the Spiritual Realism of Octavia Butler's Earthseed." Utopian Studies 23. 2 2012 pp. 408–429. .
 Lacey, Lauren. J. "Octavia Butler on Coping with Power in Parable of the Sower, Parable of the Talents, and Fledgling." Critique 49.4 (Summer 2008): 379–394.
 Mayer, Sylvia. "Genre and Environmentalism: Octavia Butler's Parable of the Sower, Speculative Fiction, and the African American Slave Narrative." Restoring the Connection to the Natural World: Essays on the African American Environmental Imagination. Ed. Sylvia Mayer. Munster, Ger.: LIT, 2003. 175–196. 
 Melzer, Patricia. "'All That You Touch You Change': Utopian Desire and the Concept of Change in Octavia Butler's Parable of the Sower and Parable of the Talents." Contemporary Literary Criticism Select. Gale, 2008. Originally published in FEMSPEC 3.2 (2002): 31–52.
 Nilges, Mathias. We Need the Stars': Change, Community, and the Absent Father in Octavia Butler's 'Parable of the Sower' and 'Parable of the Talents.'" Callaloo 32.4 2009 pp. 1332–1352. . 
 Phillips, Jerry. "The Institution of the Future: Utopia and Catastrophe in Octavia Butler's Parable of the Sower." Novel: A Forum on Fiction 35.2/3 Contemporary African American Fiction and the Politics of Postmodernism (Spring – Summer, 2002), pp. 299–311. .
 Stanford, Ann Folwell. "A Dream of Communitas: Octavia Butler's Parable of the Sower and Parable of the Talents and Roads to the Possible." Bodies in a Broken World: Women Novelists of Color and the Politics of Medicine. Chapel Hill: The U of North Carolina P, 2003. 196–218. 
 Stillman, Peter G. "Dystopian Critiques, Utopian Possibilities, and Human Purposes in Octavia Butler's Parables." Utopian Studies 14.1 (2003): 15–35. .
 Texter, Douglas W. "Of Gifted Children and Gated Communities: Paul Theroux's O-Zone and Octavia Butler's The Parable of the Sower." Utopian Studies 19. 3 2008 pp. 457–484. .

References

External links

 
  YouTube video of a map of the California odyssey in Parable of the Sower

1993 American novels
Dystopian novels
Epistolary novels
Feminist science fiction novels
Fiction set in 2024
American science fiction novels
1993 science fiction novels
African-American novels
Novels by Octavia Butler
Social science fiction
Religion in science fiction
Novels about poverty
Works about emotions
Novels adapted into operas
Literature by women
Literature by African-American women
Climate change novels
Hugo Award for Best Graphic Story-winning works